Gora (Bengali: গোরা) is a novel by Rabindranath Tagore, set in Calcutta (now Kolkata), in the 1880s during the British Raj. It is the fifth in order of writing and the longest of Tagore’s twelve novels. It is rich in philosophical debate on politics and religion.
Other themes include liberation, universalism, brotherhood, gender, feminism, caste, class, tradition versus modernity, urban elite versus rural peasants, colonial rule, nationalism and the Brahmo Samaj.

Contents
Gora consists of two parallel love stories of two pairs of lovers: Gora and Sucharita, Binoy and Lolita. Their emotional development is shown in the background of the social and political problems prevalent in India towards the end of the 19th-century.

Plot 
The story mainly revolves around its protagonist, Gormohan alias 'Gora', a ‌staunch Hindu Brahmin. Gora is a young man with a well-built body, good stature, white complexion, and a heavy voice. Because of his physique, he is the head of his circle of friends. Despite not being handsome, Gora is considered attractive because of his heavy speech and high stature. Gora's best friend is Binoybhushan aka Binoy. Binoy is a friendly and handsome young man. He has a special affection for Gora's mother Anandamayi, and regards Anandamayi as his mother as he was orphaned as a child. One day Binoy meets a Brahmo Samaji Paresh Babu and his daughter Sucharita when their wagon crashes outside Binoy's house. Binoy helps them, and starts visiting their house. And then Binoy is introduced to Paresh Babu, his wife Varadasundari, his eldest daughter Lavanya, middle daughter Lalita, and younger daughter Leela. Along with them, he is introduced to Sucharita, the adopted daughter of Paresh Babu, and Satish, Sucharita's real brother. At the time of the story there is an ongoing conflict between the Brahmo Samaj and Hinduism; as Gora is a staunch Hindu who believes in untouchability, he forbids Binoy to meet Paresh Babu and his family. This leads to an argument between the two. Gora accuses Binoy of being attracted to Paresh Babu's daughter, but Binoy denies this. Gora's father Krishnadayal, a good friend of Paresh Babu, one day urges Gora to visit Paresh Babu's house to inquire about his well being. When Gora goes there, Binoy is already present, disappointing and angering Gora. There, Gora is introduced to Haran alias Panu Babu, who is Bengali but has special affection for the British. Haran Babu is a special head of the Brahmo Samaj, and is going to marry Sucharita. Due to Gora's being Hindu, he does not get the same respect at Paresh Babu's house as Binoy did. He gets into an argument with Haran Babu. Sucharita, who earlier saw Gora as inferior because of his fanaticism, supports Gora by not supporting Haran Babu in the debate. Gora is then very angry with Binoy, but due to his special affection for him cannot leave him.

Later, Gora has to go to Paresh Babu's house once again, where Gora's love for Sucharita awakens; Sucharita reciprocates those feelings. Gora, who has sworn that he will never marry, feels deeply guilty about this and immediately sets off on an unknown journey. Varadasundari gets along well with Magistrate Brownlow, and she chooses Binoy and Lalita to star in a show at his house. Gora travels to a village which is haunted by the atrocities of the magistrate and the superintendent. He vows to bring justice to the village and rebels against the magistrate. Enraged by this, the magistrates send Gora to jail for a month without trial for any crime. Hearing this, Lalita, who cannot tolerate injustice, is enraged. Due to this she comes home overnight on a steamer with Binoy. The steamer incident — that a Brahmo girl has come alone with a Hindu boy at night — stirs up the Brahmo Samaj. Lalita becomes notorious, so Varadasundari blames Binoy. Binoy agrees to join the Brahmo Samaj under societal pressure, but Gora objects to it, with Lalita also forbidding Binoy from doing so.

After being released from prison, Gora starts visiting Sucharita's house. Sucharita accepts Gora as her guru. Meanwhile, Binoy and Lalita get married.
When one day, when Krishnadayal falls ill, he informs Gora of the truth about his origins. He explains that Gora is not actually his son, but the son of a Christian Irishman. They had met when he lived in Etawah; when war broke out there, Gora's military father was killed. Gora's mother was dependent on Krishnadayal's goodwill and gave birth to Gora in his house, dying in the process. Krishnadayal has raised him since. In that one moment, Gora's whole life is destroyed, the religion for which he sacrificed his whole life having rejected him. Eventually, Gora accepts Paresh Babu as his guru, after drinking water from Lachmiya's hand.

Characters 

 Gormohan aka Gora/Gaur the protagonist, Anandmayi and Krishnadayal's adopted son
 Binoybhushan aka Binoy (Vinay) Gora's best friend and Lolita's husband
 Sucharita (birth name: Radharani) adopted daughter of Paresh Babu and Vardasundari, sister of Satish
 Lolita (Lalita) Paresh Babu and Vardasundari's second daughter, Binoy's wife
 Pareshchandra bhattacharya aka Paresh Babu Husband of Vardasundari, father of Lavanya, Lolita and Leela.
 Anandmoyi (Anandmayi) Foster mother of Gora, step mother of Mahim and Krishnadayal's wife
 Haran Babu aka Panu Babu A Brahmo Samaji who hates Bengali and Indian culture and impressed with Britishers and jealous of Binoy and Gora 
 Mahim step brother of Gora, son of Krishnadayal from his late wife
 Krishnadayal a staunch Hindu like Gora, father of Mahim, foster father of Gora and husband or Anandmayi 
 Harimohini maternal aunt of Sucharita and Satish 
 Shri Satishchandra Mukhopadhyaya aka Satish adopted son of Paresh Babu and Vardasundari and real brother of Sucharita best friend of Binoybhushan.
 Kailash brother - in - law of Harimohini 
 Avinash student of Gora 
 Lavanya eldest daughter of Paresh Babu and Vardasundari 
 Leela youngest daughter of Paresh Babu and Vardasundari 
 Shashimukhi daughter of Mahim
 Mahim's wife 
 Lachmiya Christian servant of Anandmoyi

Translations
Malayalam translation of Gora with the same title was done by Dr. K. C. Ajayakumar. For this, in 2015, Ajayakumar has won the Sahitya Akademi Award for translation. Hindi translation of this novel was done by famous Hindi poet and author Agyeya.
'Gora'was translated into English by W W Pearson in 1924.

Adaptations
Film adaptations exist from 1938, when director Naresh Mitra made a Bengali film in the same name based on the novel. and from 2015, directed by Shukla Mitra. In 2012 Hindi channel Doordarshan broadcast a 26-episode television series by producer Gargi Sen and director Somnath Sen.

Further reading

See also
 Adaptations of works of Rabindranath Tagore in film and television

References

External links
  (Bengali)
  (English translation)
  (English translation with notes)
গোরা সমগ্ৰহ

Novels by Rabindranath Tagore
1909 novels
Indian Bengali-language novels
Brahmoism
Interfaith dialogue
Hinduism and Islam
Novels about nationalism
Novels set in British India
Indian novels adapted into films
Indian novels adapted into television shows